Malmö Flygindustri was a small aviation and car company in south Sweden which specialized in small single-propeller aircraft and various plastic objects. It was later acquired by SAAB.

Products
Aircraft
 MFI-9
 MFI-10 Vipan
 BA-12 Sländan
 BA-14 Starling
 Saab Safari

Automobiles
 Saab Sonett

References

Aircraft manufacturers of Sweden